Felix Carl Wright (born June 22, 1959), is a former professional American football player who played defensive back from 1985–1992 for the Cleveland Browns and Minnesota Vikings in the National Football League.

Undrafted out of Drake University, Wright played from 1982–84 in the Canadian Football League with the Hamilton Tiger-Cats, earning Eastern Division All-Star honors in his last two seasons. In his final year, he intercepted two passes in Hamilton's 72nd Grey Cup game loss. In 1989, Wright led the NFL in interceptions with 9.

NFL career
He signed with the Browns as a free agent on April 13, 1985, spending his first season with the team in a specialization role in the secondary as well as seeing action on the special teams squad. The following season, he intercepted three passes and thrived on special teams, blocking one punt that was recovered for a touchdown, partially blocking another punt and then returning a blocked punt 30 yards for a touchdown in the Browns' October 26 road victory over the Minnesota Vikings.

Exactly one year after his game against the Vikings, Wright earned Player of the Week accolades in a game against the Los Angeles Rams. In the game, he intercepted one pass and returned it 68 yards to set up Cleveland's first score, then later ran 40 yards with another interception for a touchdown. In 1988, Wright ended the year with three multi-interception games, including a pair in the team's loss to the Houston Oilers in the AFC wild card game, winning AFC Defensive Player of Month in December. The following season, he led the NFL in interceptions with 9. In the November 5 road victory over the Tampa Bay Buccaneers, Wright returned a pass 27 yards for a touchdown.

Felix's younger brother Charles Wright enjoyed a career in both the CFL and briefly in the NFL. His brother, Joe Wright, played professional basketball in Europe.

References

External links
College stats

1959 births
Living people
People from Carthage, Missouri
Players of American football from Missouri
American football safeties
Drake Bulldogs football players
African-American players of American football
African-American players of Canadian football
Canadian football defensive backs
Hamilton Tiger-Cats players
Cleveland Browns players
Minnesota Vikings players
Kansas City Chiefs players
21st-century African-American people
20th-century African-American sportspeople